George Ross Morgan (10 October 1877 – 8 July 1948) was an  Australian rules footballer who played with St Kilda in the Victorian Football League (VFL).

He later served in World War I.

References

External links 

1877 births
1948 deaths
Australian military personnel of World War I
Australian rules footballers from Victoria (Australia)
Echuca Football Club players
People educated at Scotch College, Melbourne
St Kilda Football Club players